Ihor Olehovych Karpenko (born 24 September 1997) is a Ukrainian professional footballer who plays as a forward.

Career
Karpenko is a product of the Karpaty Lviv School System and then played for FC Karpaty in the Ukrainian Premier League Reserves and Under 19 Championship.

He made his debut for FC Karpaty as a main-squad player in a home losing game against FC Dynamo Kyiv on 31 July 2019 in the Ukrainian Premier League.

On 11 August 2022, he signed a one-year contract with Polish III liga side Odra Wodzisław Śląski. Nine days later, Karpenko scored his sole goal for Odra on his league debut in a 2–2 away draw against Rekord Bielsko-Biała. On 2 November 2022, he mutually agreed to terminate his contract with Odra.

Honours
Podillya Khmelnytskyi
 Ukrainian Second League runner-up: 2020–21

References

External links
 
 

1997 births
Living people
Sportspeople from Lviv
Ukrainian footballers
Association football forwards
FC Karpaty Lviv players
FC Volyn Lutsk players
FC Podillya Khmelnytskyi players
FC Akzhayik players
Odra Wodzisław Śląski players
JK Narva Trans players
Ukrainian Premier League players
Ukrainian First League players
Ukrainian Second League players
Kazakhstan Premier League players
III liga players

Ukrainian expatriate footballers
Expatriate footballers in Estonia
Expatriate footballers in Kazakhstan
Expatriate footballers in Poland
Ukrainian expatriate sportspeople in Estonia
Ukrainian expatriate sportspeople in Kazakhstan
Ukrainian expatriate sportspeople in Poland